Alive is the only album by American pop girl group 3rd Party. The album was released on October 7, 1997 by DV8 Records. 

In addition to a cover of Gary Wright's 1976 hit "Love Is Alive", this album also contains the original recording of Waiting for Tonight which would become a big hit for Jennifer Lopez two years later, on which Christensen (who also co-wrote the song) also performed background vocals.

Track listing
"Can U Feel It" (Arnie Roman, Steve Skinner) – 4:11 
"Love Is Alive" (Gary Wright) – 3:50 
"Round & Round" (Andy Marvel, Arnie Roman, Peter Zizzo) – 4:11 
"Waiting For Tonight" (Maria Christensen, Michael Garvin, Phil Temple) – 4:00
"Second Nature" (Christensen, Matt Noble, Denise Rich) – 3:38
"So Inspired" (Marvel, Nina Ossoff, Shelly Peiken) – 4:13
"One Night" (Rich, Roman, Rich Tancredi) – 4:19
"Step by Step" (Gary Haase, Audrey Martells) – 4:30
"Love and Emotion" (Christensen, Curt Frasca) – 4:08
"If My Heart Could Talk" (Christensen, Jeff Franzel) – 4:33
"Listening to the Rain" (Terence Dover, Chris Dover) – 4:13
"Can U Feel It (LCD Galactica Mix)" (Roman, Skinner) – 8:55

Personnel 

Maria Christensen – vocals
Karmine Alers – background vocals
Elaine Borja – background vocals

1997 debut albums
3rd Party albums